The Singapore Literature Prize (abbreviation: SLP) is a biennial award in Singapore to recognise outstanding published works by Singaporean authors in any of the four official languages: Chinese, English, Malay and Tamil. The competition is organised by the National Book Development Council of Singapore (NBDCS) with the support of the National Arts Council and the National Library Board.

The Award was briefly discontinued in 1999 and 2002 due to economic problems.

Awards

2018

Fiction 
English
Winner: Jeremy Tiang - State of Emergency
 Balli Kaur Jaswal - Sugarbread
 Jennani Durai - Regrettable Things that Happened Yesterday
 Nuraliah Norasid - The Gatekeeper
 Wong Souk Yee - Death of a Perm Sec
Chinese
Co-Winner: Lee Chuan Low - Rescue Frontline
Co-Winner: Zhang Hui - Smoker Memories
 Lin Gao - Life Between Frames
 Xi Ni Er - The Floating Republic
 Li Qing Song - Manuscript – Collection of Short Stories
Malay
Merit: Hamed bin Ismail - A Dancing Club: Bunga Tanjong
Commendation: Adam bin Fadilla - Muezzin in Search of Light
Commendation: Farihan Bahron - Avatar's Wrath
 Djohan A Rahman - When the Alphabets Dance
 Hassan Hassa'Ree Ali - Souvenir From Space
Tamil
Merit: Chitra Ramesh - A Drop of Happiness
Merit: M K Kumar - 5.12 pm
 Prema Mahalingam - Water Droplets

Poetry
English
Winner: Samuel Lee - A Field Guide to Supermarkets in Singapore
Chinese
Winner: Tan Chee Lay - Landmark Poetics of the Lion City
Malay
Winner: Farihan Bahron - Finger-Pointing Expert
Tamil
Commendation: M Segar - Ravana's Seethai
Commendation: A K Varadharajan - Lee Kwan Yew Imaginary Childhood

Non-fiction
English
Winner: Melissa De Silva - "Others" is Not a Race
Chinese
Co-Winner: Liu Su - Roses at the Edge
Co-Winner: Weng Xian-wei - The Second Face
Malay
Commendation: Ahmad Md Tahir - Colour of Expression
Tamil
Winner: Bala Baskaran - G Sarangapany and the Tamil Murasu: A Current Appraisal

2016
The 2016 edition received the most submissions ever in its 25-year history: 235 entries, compared to 2014's 182 and 2012's 57, with fiction receiving the most submissions.

Fiction
English
Winner: Sonny Liew - The Art of Charlie Chan Hock Chye
Jeremy Tiang - It Never Rains on National Day
Leonora Liow - Moth: Stories
Audrey Chin - Nine Cuts
Mohamed Latiff Mohamed, trans. Alfian Sa'at - The Widower
Chinese
Commendation: 谢裕民 (Chia Joo Ming) - Exile or Pursuit《放逐与追逐》
Commendation:  张挥 (Cheong Weng Yat aka Zhang Hui) - Shuang Kou Ding Yi Cun 《双口鼎一村－那些年那些事》
Merit:  英培安 (Yeng Pway Ngon) - Opera Costume 《戲服》
Malay
Winner: Peter Augustine Goh - Air Mata di Arafah
Peter Augustine Goh - Bayang-Bayang Yang Hilang
Suratman Markasan - Dari Perang Datang Sampai Kamoe San Masuk Melayu
Leyla Shuri - Terbelah Bintang Subaru
Tamil
Winner: Sithuraj Ponraj - Maariligal
Krishnamurthi Mathangi - Melbaculaso
Suriya Rethnna - Paramapadham

Poetry
English
Co-winner: Cyril Wong - The Lover's Inventory
Co-winner: Desmond Kon Zhicheng-Mingde - I Didn’t Know Mani Was a Conceptualist
Eric Tinsay Valles - After the Fall: Dirges Among Ruins
Tse Hao Guang - Deeds of Light
Gwee Li Sui - One Thousand and One Nights
Cheryl Julia Lee - We Were Always Eating Expired Things
Chinese
Merit: 吳耀宗  (Gabriel Wu) - Live Where the Imagination Is 《逐想像而居》 
Merit: 陈维彪 (Tang Jui Piow) - The Sea Diary 《航海纪事》
 沈璧浩 (Sim Piak How) - A City's Story《都市录》
Malay
Winner: Hamed Ismail, Hartinah Ahmad, and Samsudin Said - Tafsiran Tiga Alam
Noor Aisya bte Buang - Kastil Aisya
Leo Suryadinatan - Kota Singa
Tamil
Merit: Varadharajan AK - 4 Flowered Garland for Singapore
Merit: Sithuraj Ponraj - Kaatraai Kadanthaai
Naa Aandeappan - Adolescent Love
Malarvizhi Elangovan - Alai Pidunkiya Sorkal
Saba Muthunatarajan - The Face of the Soul
Segar s/o Muniandy - Kaivilakku Kadavul

Non-fiction
English
Co-winner: Danielle Lim - The Sound of Sch: A Mental Breakdown, A Life Journey
Co-winner: Peh Shing Huei - When the Party Ends
You Jin, trans. Shelly Bryant - In Time, Out of Place
Loke Hoe Yeong - Let the People Have Him
Ning Cai - Who is Magic Babe Ning?
Chinese
Winner: 陈加昌 (Chin Kah Chong) - LKY Whom I Knew 《我所知道的李光耀》
 尤今 (You Jin) - Father and I《父亲与我》 
 李慧敏  (Lee Hui Min) - Growing Up in the Era of Lee Kuan Yew 《成长在李光耀时代》 
 李国樑 (Lee Kok Leong) - Guangdong Majie 《广东妈姐》
 柯思仁 (Quah Sy Ren) - Tea Time in Spring With Poetry 《以诗和春光佐茶》
Malay
Merit: Ahmad Azmi bin Haji Mohamed Ishak - Rentak Rebana
Commendation: Hafiza Talib - Sekolahku Tinggal Kenangan
Tamil
Commendation: Kotti Thirumuruganandam - CK Makadoom Saiboo and Singai Nes
Commendation: Varadharajan AK - Kamban Kaattum Kanaikal
Commendation: Mohamed Kassim Shanavas - Nanavu Desam SG50
Commendation: SP Panneer Selvam - Singapore Tamil Munnodigal

2014
For the first time, the award offered 12 top prizes of up to $10,000 each for the best works of fiction, non-fiction and poetry in Chinese, English, Malay and Tamil. In previous years, fiction competed with poetry for one award in each language.

In July 2014, three judges of the English non-fiction category of the prize resigned in protest against the National Library Board's removal and pulping of controversial children's titles. Mr T. Sasitharan, a prominent arts educator; former journalist Romen Bose; and American author and Writer-in-Residence at Yale-NUS College, Robin Hemley were subsequently replaced. The Prize also received flak for perhaps spreading itself too thin, and for naming the non-fiction prizes after a sponsor, the publisher World Scientific.

A day after the winners were announced at an awards ceremony on 4 November 2014, poet-editor Grace Chia, whose poetry collection Cordelia was shortlisted but did not win in the English Poetry section, delivered a speech in absentia at the Singapore Writers Festival which accused the Prize of sexism. Chia wrote, "The fact that the prize has been given to two co-winners who are both male poets is deeply informing of choice, taste and affirmation. A prize so coveted that it has been apportioned to two male narratives of poetic discourse, instead of one outstanding poet - reeks of an engendered privilege that continues to plague this nation's literary community." Chia also posted her speech on Facebook before subsequently removing it. In response, one of the poetry judges, poet and literary critic Gwee Li Sui, said, "All entries have an equal chance of consideration for winning, and we discussed it based on that point alone, and on the strengths of the collections." The other poetry judges were prominent female poet Leong Liew Geok and poet Boey Kim Cheng.

Fiction
English
Winner: Amanda Lee Koe - Ministry of Moral Panic
Claire Tham - The Inlet
O Thiam Chin - Love, or Something Like Love
Audrey Chin - As the Heart Bones Break
Chinese
Winner: Lim Hung Chang (Lin Gao) - Weixingxiaoshuo(林高微型小说／林高)
Lai Yong Taw - Ding Xiang (丁香／流军)
Tham Yew Chin (You Jin) - Jin Se Dai Shu(金色袋鼠／尤今)
Lee Xuan Lou - Shuang Cheng Zhi Lian(双城之恋／李选楼) 
Malay
Winner: Yazid bin Hussein - Kumpulan Cerpen (Armageddon)
Abdul Manaf bin Abdul Kadir - Suzan
Anuar bin Othman - Tenggelamnya Kapal  (Prince of Wales)
Hassan Hasaa'ree Ali - Selamat Malam (Caesar)
Yazid bin Hussein - Cahaya
Mohd Pitchay Gani bin Mohd Abdul Aziz - Seking
Tamil
Winner: Mohamed Kassim Shanavas - Moontraavatu Kai
Jayanthi Sankar - Muga Puthagamum Sila Agappakkangalum
Suriya Rethnna - Naan
Noorjehan binte Ahmadsha - Vergal
Packinisamy Panneerselvam - Maaya
Krishnamurthi Mathangi - Oru Kodi Dollargal

Poetry
English
Co-winner: Joshua Ip - Sonnets from the Singlish
Co-winner: Yong Shu Hoong - The Viewing Party
Grace Chia - Cordelia
Theophilus Kwek - The Circle Line
Tania De Rozario - Tender Delirium
Koh Jee Leong - The Pillow Book
Malay
Winner: Johar Buang - Pasar Diri
Peter Augustine Goh - Genta Cinta
Ahmad Md Tahir - Aisberg Kesimpulan
Hamed bin Ismail - Suara Dalam
Yazid bin Hussein - nota (buat wangsa dan buanaku)
Tamil
Commendation: Krishnamurthi Mathangi – Malaigalin Parathal
Samuel Nepolian Devakumar – Kaanaamal Pona Kavithaikal
Chinnadurai Arumugam – Thagam
Pichinikkadu Elango – Thoorikai Sirpangal
Swaminathan Amirthalingam – Urakkach Cholvaen

Non-fiction
English
 Co-winner: Lim Siong Guan - The Leader, The Teacher & You
 Co-winner: Josephine Chia - Kampong Spirit Gotong Royong: Life In Potong Pasir 1955 to 1965
 M. Ravi - Kampong Boy
 Hidayah Amin - The Mango Tree
 Fanny Lai - A Visual Celebration of Giant Pandas

Chinese
 Merit: Dr Ho Nai Kiong - The Biography of My Father 何乃强《父亲平藩的一生》
 Merit: Tham Yew Chin (You Jin) - Even The Heart Soars 尤今《心也飞翔》
 Dr Ho Nai Kiong - The Death of Kings and Emperors 何乃强《医生读史笔记》
 Tham Yew Chin (You Jin) - Release Your Happiness 尤今《释放快乐》

Malay
 Merit: Mohamed Latiff Mohamed - Alam Kepenyairan Singapura: Pengamatam dan Penciptaan

Tamil
 Winner: Kotti Thirumuruganandam - Singapore Tamil Kavithai Varalaaru (History Of Singapore Tamil Poetry)
 Chitra Ramesh - Oru Nakarathin Kathai (Story Of A City)
 R Kalamohan - Sattamum Sambavangalum (Law And Incidents)
 Mohamed Kassim Shanavas - Ayal Pasi (Foreign Hunger)

2012
English Category
Winner: Eddie Tay – The Mental Life of Cities
Leonard Ng – This Mortal World
Dave Chua – The Beating & Other Stories
Teng Qian Xi – They hear salt crystallising

Chinese Category
Winner: Yeng Pway Ngon (英培安) – 画室 (Art Studio)
Tan Chee Lay (陈志锐) – 《剑桥诗学》
Neo Choon Hong (梁钺) – 《你的名字》
Zou Lu (邹璐) – 《追随河流的方向》
Lee Seng Chan (怀鹰) – 《舞魂》
Malay Category
Merit: Ahmad Ja’affar Bin Munasip – Jago Yang Terlupa Dilupakan
Commendation: Peter Augustine Goh Mey Teck – Kerana Setitik Madu
Commendation: Rohman Munasip – Secangkir Ceritera
Commendation: Yazid Hussein – Dongeng Utopia : Kisah Cek YahTamil Category
Winner: Ramanathan Vairavan – Kavithai Kuzhanthaikal Masilamani Anbalagan – En Vaanam Naan Megam Yousuf Rowther Rajid Ahmed – Vizhikkullethaan Vellayum Karuppum Marimuthu Arumugam Elango – Antha Naan Illai Naan2010
English Category
Winner: Simon Tay – City of Small BlessingsToh Hsien Min – Means To An EndWena Poon – The Proper Care Of FoxesChinese Category
Co-Winner: Gabriel Wu (吴耀宗) – 半存在 (A Half-Existence)
Co-Winner: Chia Joo Ming (谢裕民) – M40
Wang Wenxian (王文献) – 《爱城故事》
Wong Meng Voon (黄孟文) –《黄孟文微型小说自选集》
Ng Wai Choy (吴韦材) – 《爱的礼物》

Malay Category
Winner: Johar Buang – Sampai di Singgahsana CintaAbdul Manaf Abdul Kadir  (Manaf Hamzah) – Dalam Kehangatan Dakapan SenjaAzni Ismail (Jaka Budi) – Di Perhentian Ini… Hijrahkanlah DiriNoor Hasnah Adam – KelaraiYazid Bin Hussein – Satu Macam PenyakitTamil Category
Winner: Murugathasan – SangamamJayanthi Sankar – MigrationMarimuthu Arumugam Elango  (Pichinikkadu Elango) – Naanum NaanumMasilamani Anbalagan – Ayapulam2008

English category
 Winner: Ng Yi-Sheng – last boy	
 Aaron Lee Soon Yong – Five Right Angles Wena Poon – Lions in Winter: Stories Elmo Jayawardena – Rainbows in Braille Suchen Christine Lim – The Lies that Build a MarriageChinese category
 Co-winner: Chia Hwee Pheng (谢惠平) – 希尼尔小说选 (The Collection of Xi Ni Er Mini-Fiction)
 Co-winner: Yeng Pway Ngon (英培安) – 我与我自己的二三事 (Trivialities About Me and Myself)
 Chia Joo Ming (谢裕民) – 谢裕民小说选
 Liang Wern Fook (梁文福) – 左手的快乐
 Teoh Hee La aka Zhang Xi Na(张曦娜) – 张曦娜小说选
 Pan Cheng Lui (潘正镭) – 天微明时我是诗人

Malay category
 Winner: Mohamed Latiff Mohamed – Bila Rama-rama Patah Sayapnya Muhammad Salihin bin Sulaiman Jeem – Anugerah Bulan Buat Bonda Suratman Markasan – Langau Menyerang Masjid Dan Cerita-Ceritanya Peter Augustine Goh – Cetusan Kalbu Seorang Penyair Johar Buang – Perahu Melayu Di Lautan Khulzum Manaf Hamzah – Sekeras Waja, Selembut SuteraTamil category
 Winner: K. Kanagalatha – Naan Kolai Seyum Penkal (The Women I Murder) Jayanthi Sankar – Pin Seat (Back Seat) J.M. Sali – Aayul Thandanai Palanisamy Subramanian – Ouyir Ourugum Sabtham2006

English category
 Co-winner: Cyril Wong – Unmarked Treasure Co-winner: Yong Shu Hoong – Frottage Aaron Sahhril Yusoff Maniam – Morning at Memory’s BorderChinese category
 Winner: Chia Joo Ming (谢裕民) – 重构南洋图像 Chong Gou Nan Yang Yu Xiang (Reconstructing Nanyang) Denon Lim Denan (林得楠) – 梦见诗
 Chia Hwee Pheng (希尼尔) – 希尼尔微型小说

Malay category
 Winner: Mohamed Latiff Mohamed – Nostalgia Yang Hilang (The End Of Nostalgia) Anuar Othman – Kisah Di Bukit Cermin Suratman Markasan – Puisi Luka dan Puisi Duka Peter Augustine Goh – Warna sebuah Penghijrahan Johar Bin Buang – Cahaya di Negeri iniTamil category 
 Winner: Mohamed Iqbal – Vanavargal Mannil Irukkirarkal (Angels Are Here On Earth) K. Kanagalatha – Paampuk Kaattil oru Taazai Kavignareru Amallathasan – Pullanguzhal Murugathasan – Vadamalar2004

English category
 Winner: Tan Hwee Hwee – Mammon Inc Felix Cheong – Broken by the Rain Suchen Christine Lim – A Bit of Earth Alfian bin Sa’at – A History of Amnesia Claire Tham – The Gunpowder Trail & Other StoriesChinese category
 Winner: Yeng Pway Ngon (英培安) – 骚动
 Chia Hwee Pheng (希尼尔) – 轻信莫疑
 Guan Ming (关明) – 其实·底下的城市

Malay category
 Winner: Mohamed Latiff Mohamed – Bagiku Sepilah Sudah Abdul Ghani Hamid – Ombak Terbang Tinggi A Wahab HJ Hamzah – Tuhan Masih Sayang Isa Kamari – Kiswah Masuri SN – Suasana Senja Rohani Din – Anugerah Buat SyamsiahTamil category
 Winner: Ma Elankannan (M Balakrishnan) – Thondil Meen S Uthuman Ghani – Agrinai Uyarthinai K T M Iqbal – Kaakitha Vaasam Krishnasamy Iyer Kanagalatha – Thee Velli Murugathasan – Thaembavai Subraa (Palanisamy Subramanian) – Uyirril Kalantha Urrave2000 (as The Dymocks Singapore Literature Prize)
Rex Shelley, A River of Roses1998 Fiction
Merit
Rosemary Lim - Soul Search & Other Stories (published as The Seed from the Tree) 
Colin Cheong - The Man in the CupboardCommendation
Alfian bin Sa'at -  Corridor and Other StoriesDaren Shiau - Heartland1997 Poetry

Merit
 Paul Tan - Driving into Rain1996 Fiction

Winner
 Colin Cheong - TangerineCommendation
Dave Chua Hak Lien - Gone CasePat Wong - Going Home & Other Stories1995 Poetry

Winner
Roger Vaughan Jenkins - From the Belly of the CarpMerit
Boey Kim Cheng - Days of No NameCommendation
Colin Cheong - Void Deck and Other Empty Places1994 Fiction

Merit
Tan Mei Ching - Crossing Distance Stella Kon - EstonCommendation
David Leo - Wives, Lovers and Other WomenDenyse Tessensohn - FeelAndrew Koh - Glass Cathedral1993

Poetry
Merit
Desmond Sim - Places Where I've BeenCommendation
Jeffery T.H. Lee - The Sea is Never Full 
Paul Tan - Curious RoadDrama
Merit
Haresh Sharma - Still BuildingCommendation
Sim Teow Li -  Curios1992 Fiction

Winner
Suchen Christine Lim - Fistful of ColoursCommendation
 Tan Mei Ching - Beyond the Village GateNotes

 
References
Singapore Literature Prize - National Book Development Council of Singapore
 Singapore Literature Prize: Celebrating Our Writers 1992-2018''. Singapore 2018/2019